This list is an attempt to document every song recorded and released under the name of Mike Love, whether on an album, single, compilation or anthology album.

Love, Mike
Mike Love